Fatma Sultan ("One who abstains";  or before – ) was an Ottoman princess, daughter of Selim I and Hafsa Sultan. She was the sister of Sultan Suleiman the Magnificent.

Biography
She was first married in 1516 to Mustafa Pasha, governor of Antakya; however they divorced when it turned out that he was homosexual and had no interest in her.

Then, she married in 1522 to Kara Ahmed Pasha, who was the Grand Vizier of the Ottoman Empire between 1553 and 1555, and they had two daughters. After his execution, she went to live in Bursa or, according to other sources, was forcibly married in 1555 to Hadim Ibrahim Pasha, presumably as a punishment for her intrigues. However, it turned out to be the happiest of all her marriages. 

Fatma Sultan built a mosque in Topkapı. Fatma died around 1556  and was buried in Kara Ahmed Pasha's tomb. In 1575 Murad III build Fatma Sultan Mosque in honor of his great-aunt.

Depictions in literature and popular culture
In the TV series Muhteşem Yüzyıl, Fatma Sultan is played by Turkish actress Meltem Cumbul.

See also

Ottoman Empire
Ottoman dynasty
Ottoman family tree
Ottoman Emperors family tree (simplified)

References

Further reading
 

16th-century Ottoman princesses
People from Trabzon
1500 births
1573 deaths